Poul Andreas Joachim Jensen (25 November 1899 – 12 October 1991) was a Danish amateur association football player, who played 30 games for the Denmark national football team from 1921 to 1931. Born in Copenhagen, Jensen played as a defender for B 93.

External links
Danish national team profile
Haslund.info profile

1899 births
1991 deaths
Danish men's footballers
Denmark international footballers
Boldklubben af 1893 players
Association football defenders
Footballers from Copenhagen